Tom Albert W. "Codger" Johnson (born c. 1893, Cardiff, died 6 May 1948, Cardiff) was a Wales international rugby union player. He captained the Wales national rugby union team on one occasion in 1925. Johnson played his club rugby for Cardiff RFC captaining the team during the 1924–25 season.

References

Cardiff RFC players
Swansea RFC players
Penarth RFC players
Wales international rugby union players
Wales rugby union captains
1893 births
1948 deaths
Rugby union players from Cardiff
Rugby union fullbacks
Rugby union wings